The Tibetan Communist Party was a small communist party in the Tibet, which functioned in secrecy under various names. The group was founded by Phuntsok Wangyal and Ngawang Kesang in 1943. It emerged from a group called the Tibetan Democratic Youth League, created by Wangyal and other Tibetan students in Lhasa in 1939.

The party sought to unite all Tibetans into one entity, compassing Kham, Amdo, and Ü-Tsang. The party contacted the embassy of the Soviet Union asking for its assistance as it began planning a socialist uprising in Tibet and Kham. Later Wangyal also contacted the Chinese Communist Party and the Communist Party of India.

The Tibetan communists prepared guerrilla struggles against the ruling Kuomintang, whilst promoting democratic reforms inside Tibet.

In 1949, the party merged into the Chinese Communist Party.

Notes

References 

Communist parties in China
History of the Chinese Communist Party
History of Tibet
1940s establishments in Tibet
Political parties established in 1943
Political parties disestablished in 1949
Political parties in Tibet